The U.S. state of Kentucky first required its residents to register their motor vehicles and display license plates in 1910. Plates are currently issued by the Kentucky Transportation Cabinet through its Division of Motor Vehicle Licensing. Only rear plates have been required since 1944.

Passenger baseplates

1910 to 1974
The 1955 (dated 1956) issue was the first Kentucky license plate that complied with these standards.

1975 to present

Special plates

Non-passenger plates

Government/Official plates

External links
Kentucky license plates 1969-present

References

Kentucky
Transportation in Kentucky
Kentucky transportation-related lists